Norma Johnson may refer to:
Norma Holloway Johnson (1932–2011), American judge
Norma Major (née Johnson, born 1942), wife of John Major